Lead Hill High School is a comprehensive public high school located in Lead Hill, Arkansas, United States. The school provides secondary education for students in grades 7 through 12 and serves the cities of Diamond City, Lead Hill and South Lead Hill along with surrounding unincorporated areas within Boone County. It is one of nine public high schools in Boone County, Arkansas and the sole high school administered by the Lead Hill School District.

Academics 
Lead Hill High School is accredited by the Arkansas Department of Education (ADE) and the assumed course of study follows the Smart Core curriculum developed by the ADE. Students complete regular coursework and exams and may select Advanced Placement (AP) courses and exam with the opportunity to receive college credit. They are located in Lead Hill, in North Central Arkansas nestled along Bull Shoals Lake just 40 minutes south of Branson, Missouri.

Athletics 
The Lead Hill High School mascot and athletic emblem is the tiger with red and white serving as the school colors.

The Lead Hill Tigers compete in interscholastic activities within the 1A Classification—the state's smallest classification—via the 1A 1 East Conference, as administered by the Arkansas Activities Association. The Tigers field teams in golf (boys/girls), basketball (boys/girls), track and field (boys/girls), baseball, softball, and cheer.

Future 
Lead Hill High School plans on introducing a new school flag with the help of the 2022-2023 Student Ambassadors. The plan was introduced by Nathan Smith (10th), an amateur vexillologist, who has also proposed a flag for Harrison, Arkansas. The school district approved of Nathans proposal and are currently in the process of incorporating the flag.

References

External links 
 

Public high schools in Arkansas
Schools in Boone County, Arkansas